This is a list of rugby league players who have represented their country while playing for the Toronto Wolfpack, and the years they achieved their honours.

Players

Canada

Ireland

Scotland

United States

Wales

References

 Official Website
 Rugby League Project

 
Toronto Wolfpack internationals